Christian Traoré (born 18 April 1982) is a Danish retired football defender. Besides Denmark, he has played in Sweden. He has played on the teams of  FC Midtjylland, Randers FC, Hammarby IF, Hønefoss BK, F.C. Copenhagen, HB Køge and  Lyngby Boldklub. His net worth is estimated between $1-5 Million. He is also ranked on the list of 84660 popular Association Football Players.

Personal life
Traoré was born in Denmark and is of mixed Danish and Guinean descent. He is currently living in his own house.

References

External links
 Svenskfotboll profile 

1982 births
Living people
Footballers from Copenhagen
Danish men's footballers
Denmark under-21 international footballers
Danish people of Guinean descent
Danish Superliga players
Allsvenskan players
Eliteserien players
F.C. Copenhagen players
FC Midtjylland players
Hammarby Fotboll players
Lyngby Boldklub players
HB Køge players
Hønefoss BK players
Randers FC players
Danish expatriate men's footballers
Expatriate footballers in Sweden
Expatriate footballers in Norway

Association football defenders